Abraxas Pool is a 1997 album by ex-Santana members Mike Shrieve, Neal Schon, Gregg Rolie, José "Chepito" Areas, Alphonso Johnson, and Mike Carabello.

Track listing
 "Boom Ba Ya Ya" (Michael Shrieve, Gregg Rolie, Neal Schon, Michael Carabello) - 6:44
 "A Million Miles Away" (Shrieve, Rolie, Schon) - 3:49
 "Baila Mi Cha-Cha" (José Areas) - 5:07
 "Waiting for You" (Rolie, Shrieve) - 5:08
 "Going Home" (Rolie) - 3:25
 "Szabo" (Schon, Shrieve) - 7:54
 "Guajirona" (J. Areas) - 3:05
 "Cruzin'" (Rolie) - 3:52
 "Don't Give Up" (Rolie, Schon, Shrieve) - 7:12
 "Ya Llego" (J. Areas, Carabello, Adrian Areas) - 2:48
 "Jingo" (Michael Olatunji) - 7:09

Personnel
Band members
Gregg Rolie - vocals and keyboards
Neal Schon - guitars
Alphonso Johnson - bass
Michael Shrieve - drums
Michael Carabello - congas
José Areas - timbales

Additional musicians
Carlos E. Franco, Necia Dallas, Davona Bundy - vocals on "Ya Llego"
Wole Alade, Ronald Marshall - additional drums on "Jingo"

Production
Scott Boorey, Michael Rosen - engineers
Robert Alan Craft - assistant engineer
Tom Size - mixing
Robb Davidson - editing
Mark Guenther - mastering

References

1997 albums
Santana (band)